Elin Floberghagen (born 6 November 1969) is a Norwegian journalist and organizational leader.

She was born in Frogn. She graduated as cand.mag. in folkloristics, history and social science from the University of Oslo, and was journalist for the newspaper Østlandets Blad from 1997 to 2007. She chaired the Norwegian Union of Journalists from 2007 to 2013.

References

1969 births
Living people
People from Frogn
Norwegian journalists
Norwegian trade unionists
University of Oslo alumni